Shell-less chick embryo culture is the process of growing chick embryos in vitro, without their protective egg shells, for scientific observation.

Chick embryos and other avian embryos have been used as biological models to visualize the developmental stages of embryos for education and to perform embryological manipulations. Using this technique, observations can be made, whether it is an induced-malformation caused due to the effect of teratogens or inoculations with viruses such as HIV or herpes simplex. Furthermore, methods for preservation of endangered avian species and the development of transgenic birds using surrogate egg shell culture have been created by scientists across the globe. Scientists have designed drug delivery tests in mammalian embryos to treat degenerative diseases. The technique was used in India to scrutinize glucose-induced deformities in chick embryos.

References

Embryology